The FIBT World Championships 1947 took place in St. Moritz, Switzerland for the record sixth time after hosting the event previously in 1931 (Four-man), 1935 (Four-man), 1937 (Four-man), 1938 (Two-man), and 1939 (Two-man). It marked the first time both bobsleigh events were competed at the same venue in the championships and was also the first event held after the end of World War II.

Two man bobsleigh

Four man bobsleigh

Medal table

References
2-Man bobsleigh World Champions
4-Man bobsleigh World Champions

IBSF World Championships
Sport in St. Moritz
1947 in bobsleigh
International sports competitions hosted by Switzerland
Bobsleigh in Switzerland 
1947 in Swiss sport